Ronald Nelson Carpenter (born on June 24, 1948) is a retired defensive tackle who played seven seasons in the National Football League for the Cincinnati Bengals. He attended North Carolina State University.

References

1948 births
Living people
American football defensive tackles
Cincinnati Bengals players
NC State Wolfpack football players